Rafael Hernández Colón (October 24, 1936 – May 2, 2019) was a Puerto Rican politician who served as the governor of Puerto Rico from 1973 to 1977 and 1985 to 1993 for a total of three terms. An experienced politician, Hernández held the record for having been the youngest Governor of the Commonwealth of Puerto Rico to date, having won his first term at the age of 36. Hernández was also the person to have run for governor the most times, a total of five. During his terms as governor, Hernández Colón's administrations were known for trying to invigorate the Puerto Rican economy as well as for defending the political status quo of the island. He is also the second longest-serving Puerto Rico Governor with 12 years of service due to his three terms.

Early years and education
Hernández Colón was born October 24, 1937, in Ponce, Puerto Rico, to Rafael Hernández Matos and Doraldina “Dora” Colón Clavell. Rafael and Dora married in 1934 and had three children. Rafael was the oldest. Rafael had two brothers José A. (born 1939) and César A. (1942). Hernández Colón graduated from Valley Forge Military Academy and College in Wayne, Pennsylvania, then obtained a bachelor's degree in political science from Johns Hopkins University in 1956 where he graduated with honors. In 1959, he obtained his degree in law from the University of Puerto Rico at Rio Piedras, graduating magna cum laude and as valedictorian of his class. Between 1961 and 1965 he was a lecturer on civil procedure at the Pontifical Catholic University of Puerto Rico in Ponce.

Political career
Hernández Colón affiliated himself with the Popular Democratic Party of Puerto Rico (Partido Popular Democrático, PPD). He served as Associate Commissioner of Public Service under the governorship of Roberto Sánchez Vilella. In 1965 he was named Secretary of the Department of Justice.

President of the Senate
Hernández Colón was elected to the Senate of Puerto Rico in the 1968 elections, in which his party retained control of the Senate but lost the governorship and House of Representatives. As President of the Senate, Hernández Colón became the Popular Democratic Party's President and main opposition leader. As a Senator, he proposed a constitutional amendment to lower the minimum voting age to 18, which passed in 1970. He also spearheaded efforts to persuade Congress to stop bombing practices on the island of Culebra. On the issue of political status, he opposed Governor Ferré's creation of an Ad Hoc Committee for the Presidential Vote, alleging that it was a misleading effort to enhance the island's current Commonwealth status in accordance with the results of the 1967 status plebiscite. In 1972, he successfully ran for Governor of Puerto Rico, defeating the incumbent by approximately 95,000 votes, or 7.3%. He remains the last PDP gubernatorial candidate to have achieved victory with over 50% of votes.

First term (1973–1977)
During his first term, the island was wracked by recession, induced by the 1973 oil crisis, which hit Puerto Rico particularly hard because of the many businesses that were directly related to petroleum processing in Puerto Rico. After enacting austerity measures and tax increases, the economy recovered by 1976.

In 1973, he appointed, alongside President Richard Nixon, an Ad Hoc Committee for Puerto Rico to enhance Puerto Rico's Commonwealth status pursuant to the people's mandate in the 1967 elections. The Committee rendered a report and proposal for a Compact of Permanent Union Between Puerto Rico and the United States that expanded Puerto Rico's autonomy over local affairs, expanded its right to participate in international matters, created a mechanism to object to the automatic application of federal laws, and allowed for the election of a delegate to the U.S. Senate. President Gerald Ford, who replaced Nixon, did not react to the report until after the 1976 elections, when he proposed statehood for the island. According to Hernández Colón, his delayed response was due to political pressure by island Republicans, who supported Ford in his primary against Ronald Reagan. Nevertheless, the Compact was approved by the House Subcommittee on Insular Affairs.

In 1974, Time magazine recognized Rafael Hernández Colón as one of the world's young leaders.

Hernández Colón, Treasury Secretary Salvador Casellas, and Resident Commissioner Jaime Benítez successfully lobbied Congress for Section 936, which created a tax incentive for U.S. corporations that established in Puerto Rico. The incentive remained active until 1996, when Congress enacted a phase-out which ended in 2006. Its elimination is often credited as one of the main causes for Puerto Rico's current fiscal and economic crisis.

Hernández Colón also signed Law No. 80 of 1976, which required just cause for terminating employment. In 2018, Law 80 became a hotly debated issue when the governor proposed its elimination.

Hernández Colón lost the 1976 race for Governor to then Mayor of San Juan, Carlos Romero Barceló, by 3%. He then lost again to Romero Barceló in 1980, in this second matchup by a slim margin of approximately 3,000 votes, or 0.2%.

Second and third terms (1985–1993)
Hernández Colón ran again against Romero Barceló in the November 1984 elections and was victorious by about 54,000 votes (48 to 45% respectively).   He won re-election in the 1988 election, besting his main rival Baltasar Corrada del Río by 49 to 46%.

As part of his 1984 electoral campaign, Hernández Colón released a musical album with Puerto Rican country music titled Ahora Es Que Vamos ("Here We Go Now").

During this time Puerto Rico experienced an economic boom with GDP growth at 5% during the years 1987–1989 the highest since Operation Bootstrap and the Economic Boom in the United States. Unemployment dropped drastically in his term from an all-time high 25% in 1983 to 12.0% in 1990.
He lost popularity with the controversial Pabellón de Sevilla that was an attempt of a representation of Puerto Rico at the Universal Exposition of Seville in 1992.
In January 1992 Hernández announced that he would not seek re-election. On January 11, he resigned as President of the Popular Democratic Party, a post he had held for 23 years. Senator Victoria Muñoz Mendoza succeeded him as president of the party and later became a gubernatorial candidate herself.

Personal life
On October 24, 1959, Hernández Colón married Lila Mayoral Wirshing, daughter of the industrialist Juan Eugenio Mayoral Renovales (1906-1967), founder of Ponce Candy Industries. Rafael Hernández Colón and Lila Mayoral had four children: Rafael, Jose Alfredo, Dora Mercedes and Juan Eugenio. The latter was elected to Puerto Rico’s Senate. In early 2003, Lila Mayoral Wirshing died of cancer. Hernández Colón subsequently married attorney Nelsa López in late 2004. He had his main residence in his hometown of Ponce, in the historic downtown district.

Retirement
Hernández Colón published various works specializing in law. Among his works are Procedimiento Civil: Trayectoria Histórica de la Autonomía Política Puertorriqueña and Nueva Tesis  which discusses the Puerto Rican Commonwealth's political relationship with the United States.

In later years, Hernández Colón maintained his distance from public political engagement, but continued to be involved in Puerto Rico's political affairs assisting active politicians. He occasionally appeared at official events. For example, in December 2011, he publicly admitted before the Senate of Puerto Rico that "the U.S. Congress can do as it wishes with Puerto Rico."

Some  political analysts speculated that Hernández exerted sizeable control over the PDP's party structure during his retirement from office, which may have rivaled the PDP president's.

Illness and death

On December 6, 2018, Hernández Colón announced he had been diagnosed with leukemia in November of that year. Hernández Colón died on May 2, 2019, at the age of 82. He was interred at Cementerio Católico San Vicente de Paul. after suffering from leukemia. Flags were flown at half-mast by the municipalities after his death.

Accolades
Hernández Colón was granted honoris causa degrees from Johns Hopkins University and Seton Hall University. He also had an honorary degree from the Pontifical Catholic University of Puerto Rico, where he served as a law professor in the university's Law School.

In 1985, Hernández Colón was awarded the Order of Merit of Duarte, Sánchez and Mella by the government of the Dominican Republic. In 1987 he was awarded the Cross of Isabella the Catholic by King Juan Carlos I and the government of Spain. That same year he was awarded the "Grand Cordón del Libertador" by the government of Venezuela, the Harvard Foundation Award, and the Spirit of the Caribbean Award. In 1989 he was awarded the Olympic Order Award.

On October 18, 1991, at the Campoamor Theater in Oviedo, Spain, Hernández Colón received the Prince of Asturias Award for Literature that was granted to the people of Puerto Rico by Felipe de Borbón.

See also
 List of governors of Puerto Rico
 Club of Rome
 Fundación Biblioteca Rafael Hernández Colón

Notes

References

External links
 

|-

|-

|-

|-

|-

|-

1936 births
2019 deaths
Deaths from cancer in Puerto Rico
Deaths from leukemia
Democratic Party governors of Puerto Rico
Governors of Puerto Rico
Johns Hopkins University alumni
Members of the Senate of Puerto Rico
Politicians from Ponce
Popular Democratic Party (Puerto Rico) politicians
Puerto Rican party leaders
Puerto Rican people of Spanish descent
Presidents of the Senate of Puerto Rico
Secretaries of Justice of Puerto Rico
Valley Forge Military Academy and College alumni
Burials at Cementerio Católico San Vicente de Paul